Villabezana is a hamlet and council located in the municipality of Ribera Alta/Erriberagoitia, in Álava province, Basque Country, Spain. As of 2020, it has a population of 26.

Geography 
Villabezana is located 34km west-southwest of Vitoria-Gasteiz.

References

Populated places in Álava